Torinturk is a village in Argyll and Bute, Scotland.

Torinturk comes from the Gaelic for the hill of the boar. This is where the last wild boar in Scotland was killed.

History
The present village was started in the 1930s with the building of 4 semi-detached bungalows now numbered 9, 10, 11 and 12. This was part of a nationwide scheme to help overcome high unemployment during the depression.  Each house had land at the back to keep hens on and had land down near the sea pool for growing vegetables. The men who lived in the four houses planted the trees that are now part of Achnaglachgach Forest.

Landmarks
Dùn a' Choin Duibh, a hillfort located near Torinturk

References

Villages in Knapdale